Frisilia spuriella is a moth in the family Lecithoceridae. It was described by Kyu-Tek Park in 2005. It is found in Thailand.

The wingspan is 13–13.5 mm. The species is superficially similar to Frisilia sejuncta with the termen concaved, but can be distinguished by the male genitalia.

References

Moths described in 2005
Frisilia